Dischidanthus is a genus of plants in the Apocynaceae, first described as a genus in 1936. It contains only one known species, Dischidanthus urceolatus, native to Vietnam and southern China (Guangdong, Guangxi, Hainan, Hunan, Sichuan).

References

Asclepiadoideae
Flora of China
Flora of Vietnam
Monotypic Apocynaceae genera
Taxa named by Joseph Decaisne